Elden is a village in the Orta District of Çankırı Province in Turkey. Its population is 93 (2021).

References

External links
 ELDEN KÖYÜ ÇANKIRI - CENTRAL AERIAL VIEW (In Turkish), a video on youtube

Villages in Orta District